Nebria pallipes is a species of beetle in the family Carabidae found in eastern North America.

Description
Both sexes are black coloured with orange legs, with males bigger than females.

References

External links
Nebria pallipes on Bug Guide

pallipes
Beetles described in 1823
Beetles of North America